Ali Shakouri-Rad is an Iranian physician and reformist politician. He is a member of Central Council in the Islamic Iran Participation Front and Islamic Association of Iranian Medical Society. From 2015 to 2021, he held office as the General Secretary of Union of Islamic Iran People Party.

He was the campaign manager of Mostafa Moin for the Iranian presidential election of 2005.

Shakouri-Rad was a Majlis representative from 2000 to 2004, but was disqualified by the Guardian Council to run again in the Iranian Majlis election of 2004.

On 20 April 2016, Shakouri-Rad was threatened by Hezbollah supporters while giving a speech at Elm-o-Sanaat University in Tehran criticizing Mahmoud Ahmedinejad.

References 

Deputies of Tehran, Rey, Shemiranat and Eslamshahr
Living people
Islamic Iran Participation Front politicians
Members of the 6th Islamic Consultative Assembly
People from Zanjan, Iran
Iranian reformists
Union of Islamic Iran People Party politicians
Islamic Association of Iranian Medical Society politicians
1955 births
Secretaries-General of political parties in Iran
Iranian campaign managers